= 4/5 =

4/5 or 4/5 may refer to:

- April 5 (month-day date notation)
- 4 May (day-month date notation)
